Nicolas Restif de la Bretonne, born Nicolas-Edme Rétif or Nicolas-Edme Restif (23 October 1734 – 3 February 1806), also known as  Rétif, was a French novelist. The term retifism for shoe fetishism was named after him (an early novel, entitled Fanchette's Foot, follows a beautiful heroine and her pretty little foot, which, with her pretty face, gets her and her shoe/s into lots of trouble). The man was also reputed to have coined the term "pornographer" in the same-named book, The Pornographer.

Biography
Born the son of a farmer at Sacy (in present-day Yonne), Rétif was educated by the Jansenists at Bicêtre, and on the expulsion of the Jansenists was received by one of his brothers, who was a curé. Owing to a scandal in which he was involved, he was apprenticed to a printer at Auxerre, and, having served his time, went to Paris. Here he worked as a journeyman printer, and in 1760 he married Anne or Agnès Lebègue, a relation of his former master at Auxerre. Soon he embraced Protestantism.

It was not until five or six years after his marriage that Rétif appeared as an author, and from that time to his death he produced a bewildering multitude of books, amounting to something like two hundred volumes, many of them printed with his own hand, on almost every conceivable subject. Rétif suffered at one time or another the extremes of poverty. He drew on the episodes of his own life for his books, which, "in spite of their faded sentiment, contain truthful pictures of French society on the eve of the Revolution". He has been described as both a social realist and a sexual fantasist in his writings.

The original editions of these, and indeed of all his books, have long been bibliographical curiosities owing to their rarity, the beautiful and curious illustrations which many of them contain, and the quaint typographic system in which most are composed.

The fall of the assignats during the Revolution forced him to make his living by writing, profiting on the new freedom of the press. In 1795 he received a gratuity of 2000 francs from the Thermidor Convention.
In spite of his declarations for the new power, his aristocratic acquaintances and his reputation made him fall in disgrace. Just before his death, Napoleon gave him a place in the ministry of police; he died at Paris before taking up the position.

Assessment
According to 1911 Britannica,

He and the Marquis de Sade maintained a mutual hate, while he was appreciated by Benjamin Constant and Friedrich von Schiller and appeared at the table of Alexandre Balthazar Laurent Grimod de La Reynière, whom he met in 1782.
Jean François de La Harpe nicknamed him "the Voltaire of the chambermaids".
He was rediscovered by the Surrealists in the early 20th century.

He is also noted for his advocacy of communism, indeed the term first made its modern appearance (1785) in his book review of Joseph-Alexandre-Victor Hupay de Fuveau who described himself as "communist" with his Project for a Philosophical Community.

The author Mario Vargas Llosa has a chapter on Rétif in his novel The Notebooks of Don Rigoberto.

The French novelist Catherine Rihoit made Restif de la Bretonne a major character in her 1982 novel La Nuit de Varenne. It was made into a film in the same year, a French-Italian production called either La Nuit de Varennes (French title, in English, That Night in Varennes) or Il mondo nuovo (Italian title, in English, The New World). Jean-Louis Barrault played Restif. The film also had Marcello Mastroianni as Casanova and Harvey Keitel as Thomas Paine.

Rétif was a "pornographer" in the modern sense of the word, being a writer of graphic depictions of sex.  However, he was also a "pornographer" in the Ancient Greek sense of the word, as he wrote about the day-to-day life of prostitutes, and concerned himself with their well-being.  It was the latter definition which he accepted as the rightful use of the word.

Works

The most noteworthy of his works are:
Le Pied de Fanchette, a novel (1769), the story of a pretty French orphan girl who is hounded by shoe-fetishists. 
Le Pornographe (1769), a plan for regulating prostitution which is said to have been actually carried out by the Emperor Joseph II, while not a few detached hints have been adopted by continental nations
Le Paysan perverti (1775), an erotic novel with a moral purpose, which is a big hit, causing him to follow it with "La Paysanne Pervertie" (1784).
La Vie de mon père (1779)
La Découverte Australe par un Homme-Volant (1781), a work of proto-science-fiction notorious for its prophetic inventions.
Les Contemporaines (42 vols., 1780–1785), a vast collection of short stories
Ingenue Saxancour, also a novel (1785)
Les Nuits de Paris (beginning 1786: reportage including the September Massacres of 1792)
 Anti-Justine (1793), an answer to the earlier editions of the Marquis de Sade's Justine.
The extraordinary autobiography of Monsieur Nicolas (16 vols., 1794–1797), in which at the age of sixty he has set down his remembrances, his notions on ethical and social points, his hatreds, and above all his numerous loves, both real and fancied. In it, Rétif relates the beginnings of his sexual awakenings between 1738 and 1744, when he remembers experiencing the most pleasurable of sexual stimulations in very early childhood (see text for details). However, the last two volumes are practically a separate and much less interesting work in the opinion of the redactors of the 1911 Encyclopædia Britannica.
Les Posthumes (1802) is an example of early space opera and an exercise in exolinguistics.

Works in English translation

See also
 Society of the Friends of Truth
 Victor d'Hupay
 Projet de communauté philosophe

Notes

References
 
 Philippe Barr, Rétif de la Bretonne Spectateur nocturne: une esthétique de la pauvreté, Rodopi, "Faux-Titre", 2012, 
 "Bibliographie et Iconographie de tous les ouvrages de Restif de la Bretonne"
 Monsieur Nicolas: Or, The Human Heart Laid Bare, trans., ed., and abridged by Robert Baldick (1966) (Autobiography)
 A. Porter: Restif's Novels: Or, An Autobiography in Search of an Author (1967)
 Mark Poster: The Utopian Thought of Restif de la Bretonne (1971)

External links

 
 
  Entry in Science Fiction Encyclopedia
 Official Website of "Société Rétif de La Bretonne" with biography, bibliography, news, articles, etc. and subscription at newsletter.
  Terre de ecrivains

1734 births
1806 deaths
People from Yonne
French science fiction writers
French communists
Utopian socialists
18th-century French novelists
18th-century French writers
18th-century French male writers
18th-century French dramatists and playwrights
French male short story writers
French short story writers
French erotica writers
French diarists
French printers
Spanish–French translators
French police officers
French translators
18th-century diarists
19th-century diarists